Marc-Etienne Janety (1739-1820) was the Royal Goldsmith to King Louis XVI until 1792, when the King was dethroned. A few of Janety's pieces worked in platinum (a novel metal in the late 1700s) survive. One is a platinum and glass sugar bowl (1786) at the Metropolitan Museum of Art in New York. The others are four kilograms Janety made in 1796-1799. One of them was declared the Kilogramme des Archives (Kilogram of the French Archives) and became the legal kilogram standard for France in 1799, until superseded in 1889 by a platinum-iridium kilogram made by the Johnson-Matthey company.

References

French goldsmiths
1739 births
1820 deaths